Double Wedding is a 1933 British comedy film directed by Frank Richardson and starring Joan Marion, Jack Hobbs and Viola Keats. It was made at Teddington Studios as a quota quickie.

Cake
 Joan Marion as Daisy  
 Jack Hobbs as Dick  
 Viola Keats as Mildred  
 Anthony Hankey as Roger  
 Mike Johnson as George  
 Ernest Sefton as PC

References

Bibliography
 Chibnall, Steve. Quota Quickies: The Birth of the British 'B' Film. British Film Institute, 2007.
 Low, Rachael. Filmmaking in 1930s Britain. George Allen & Unwin, 1985.
 Wood, Linda. British Films, 1927-1939. British Film Institute, 1986.

External links
 
 
 

1933 films
British comedy films
1933 comedy films
Films shot at Teddington Studios
Warner Bros. films
Quota quickies
Films directed by Frank Richardson
British black-and-white films
1930s English-language films
1930s British films